Our Fathers is a 2005 American drama television film directed by Dan Curtis and starring Ted Danson, Christopher Plummer, Brian Dennehy and Ellen Burstyn. The screenplay was written by Thomas Michael Donnelly, based on the 2004 non-fiction book Our Fathers: The Secret Life of the Catholic Church in an Age of Scandal by David France. It was the last film directed by Curtis, who died soon after it was finished.

Cast
 Ted Danson as Mitchell Garabedian
 Christopher Plummer as Cardinal Bernard Law
 Brian Dennehy as Father Dominic Spagnolia
 Daniel Baldwin as Angelo DeFranco
 Ellen Burstyn as Mary Ryan
 Kenneth Welsh as Bishop William Murphy
 Will Lyman as Wilson Rogers, Jr.
 Jan Rubeš as Pope John Paul II
 Aidan Devine as Bernie McDaid
Steven Shaw as John J. Geoghan
James Oliver as Patrick McSorley
James Kall as Geoghan's Lawyer

Awards and nominations
 Primetime Emmy Awards
 Outstanding Supporting Actor in a Miniseries or Movie (Dennehy – lost to Paul Newman, Empire Falls)
Outstanding Supporting Actor in a Miniseries or Movie (Plummer – lost to Paul Newman, Empire Falls)

 Satellite Awards
 Best Television Film (lost to Reefer Madness: The Movie Musical)
 Best Actor in a Miniseries or Television Film (Danson – lost to Jonathan Rhys Meyers, Elvis)
 Best Supporting Actor in a Series, Miniseries, or Television Film (Dennehy – lost to Randy Quaid, Elvis)

 Screen Actors Guild Award (SAG)
 Outstanding Performance by a Male Actor in a Miniseries or Television Movie (Plummer – lost to Paul Newman, Empire Falls)

 Writers Guild of America Award (WGA)
Best Writing, Long Form – Adapted (Donnelly – lost to Christopher Markus and Stephen McFeely, The Life and Death of Peter Sellers)

See also
 Catholic sex abuse cases

References

External links

2005 television films
2005 films
2005 drama films
2005 in Christianity
2000s American films
2000s English-language films
American drama television films
American films based on actual events
Cultural depictions of Pope John Paul II
Drama films based on actual events
Films about Catholic priests
Films about child sexual abuse
Films based on non-fiction books
Films critical of the Catholic Church
Films directed by Dan Curtis
Media coverage of Catholic Church sexual abuse scandals
Showtime (TV network) films
Television films based on actual events
Television films based on books